The 2013 Champion Stakes was the 137th running of the Champion Stakes horse race. It was run over one mile and two furlongs at Ascot Racecourse on 19 October 2013.

Race details
 Sponsor: QIPCO
 Winner's prize money: £737,230
 Going: Soft
 Number of runners: 10
 Winner's time: 2 minutes, 12.02 seconds

Full result

* The distances between the horses are shown in lengths

Winner details
Further details of the winner, Farhh:

 Foaled: 4 March 2008, in Great Britain
 Sire: Pivotal; Dam: Gonbarda (Lando)
 Owner: Godolphin Racing
 Breeder: Darley Stud

Form analysis

Previous Group 1 wins
Group 1 victories prior to running in the 2013 Champion Stakes:

 Farhh – Lockinge Stakes (2013)
 Cirrus des Aigles – Champion Stakes (2011), Dubai Sheema Classic (2012), Prix Ganay (2012)
 Ruler of the World – Epsom Derby (2013)
 Hunter's Light – Premio Roma (2012), Al Maktoum Challenge R3 (2013)
 Morandi – Critérium de Saint-Cloud (2012)
 Parish Hall – Dewhurst Stakes (2011)

References

2013 in British sport
2013 in English sport
2013 in horse racing
2010s in Berkshire
October 2013 sports events in the United Kingdom